Robert Victor Tambling (born 18 September 1941) is an English former professional footballer, who played as a forward, most notably for Chelsea, Crystal Palace and England. He was Chelsea's all-time top scorer for 47 years, with 202 goals in all competitions until Frank Lampard surpassed this total on 11 May 2013. Tambling remains Chelsea's all-time top scorer in league competition with 164 goals. After enjoying a successful career in the Football League during the 1960s and early 1970s, Tambling moved to Ireland. He subsequently played for several clubs in the League of Ireland and also represented the League of Ireland XI. After retiring as a player he continued to live in Ireland, residing in Crosshaven, County Cork.

Playing career

Chelsea
A talented schoolboy footballer who played for England schoolboys, his signature as a professional player was sought out by several teams including Reading, Wolverhampton Wanderers and the club he supported as a boy, Blackpool. Having met scout Jimmy Thompson and manager Ted Drake Tambling joined Chelsea as a fifteen-year-old in 1957. He made his debut, aged seventeen in 1959 scoring in a 3–2 win against West Ham United. Two years later, following the transfer of Jimmy Greaves to AC Milan, he became Chelsea's main striker and was their leading goal scorer for five seasons in the 1960s. Forming a partnership with Barry Bridges, Tambling was made club captain in 1962 by manager Tommy Docherty after Chelsea's relegation to the Second Division. With Docherty adding new players Terry Venables and Peter Bonetti Chelsea made an immediate return to the top flight with Tambling as their top scorer as he was in their first season back in the top division.

In 1965 he was a member of the team which won the 1965 Football League Cup Final. Played over two legs, Tambling scored the first goal in the first leg, a 3–2 defeat of Leicester City. Tambling was also a member of the Chelsea side which lost the 1967 FA Cup Final. Although he scored for Chelsea his 85th-minute goal was little more than a consolation as Tottenham Hotspur, with former Chelsea players Greaves and Venables, won 2–1. Tambling holds the record for the highest number of goals scored for Chelsea in a league game. He scored five goals in a 6–2 away win at Aston Villa on 17 September 1966 before being substituted by Allan Harris. His record 202 for Chelsea goals came in only 370 games. By the end of the decade Tambling had lost his place in the starting line-up to younger strikers like Peter Osgood and Ian Hutchinson. He played only seven games for Chelsea in the 1969–70 season and was not selected for the 1970 FA Cup Final between Chelsea and Leeds United. At the end of the season he transferred to Crystal Palace.

In 2004, Tambling had a suite named after him at Stamford Bridge, in honour of his status at Chelsea. He was named in the club's greatest ever XI, selected to mark the club's centenary.
Despite suffering from Martorell's ulcer, a leg condition which saw him admitted to hospital for four months in 2013, he was able to travel from his home in Ireland to be the special guest of Chelsea at their home game against Swansea City on 28 April 2013, where he made "an emotional half-time lap of honour" on a wheelchair.

Crystal Palace
Following his £40,000 transfer, Tambling played only three games for Crystal Palace during the 1969–70 season as a result of several injuries. The following two seasons saw him play 66 games scoring seventeen goals however seasons 1972–73 and 1973–74 saw only seven games and no goals. The highlight of his time with Palace was his two goals in the San Siro Stadium as Palace beat Inter Milan 2–1 in the 1971 Anglo-Italian Cup.

Ireland
In 1973 Tambling quit Crystal Palace and moved to Ireland. Tambling was a committed Jehovah's Witness and volunteered for evangelical duty in County Cork. He subsequently played for several clubs in the League of Ireland. On the advice of his former Chelsea teammate Paddy Mulligan, he first signed for Cork Celtic. In 1974, playing alongside Alfie Hale, Tambling scored 7 goals as he helped Celtic win only their only league title. He also played and scored in the 1974–75 European Cup and between 1974 and 1977 also served Celtic as player manager. He spent the 1977–78 season at Waterford United, playing alongside Peter Thomas and Johnny Matthews, before switching to Shamrock Rovers for the 1978–79 season. He finished his playing career with Cork Alberts. Tambling also briefly served as manager of Cork City during the 1984–85 season. In more recent times Tambling continues to live in Crosshaven where he also manages the local Munster Senior League side.

International career

England
Between 1962 and 1966 Tambling made 3 international appearances for England. He had previously represented England at Under 23 level. He made his full England debut on 21 November 1962 in a 4–0 win against Wales in the British Home Championship. On 27 February 1963, he scored his only international goal in a European Nations' Cup qualifier which England lost 5–2 to France at Parc de Princes. Tambling would have to wait more than three years for his next game, on 4 May 1966, a 2–0 friendly win against Yugoslavia. It would prove to be his last international appearance for England. Tambling won all three of his England caps while a Chelsea player.

League of Ireland XI
Tambling also played for the League of Ireland XI on at least 2 occasions. On 21 September 1977 at Dalymount Park he featured against a Republic of Ireland team that included Johnny Giles, Liam Brady, Steve Heighway and Don Givens. The league selection lost 2–1. On 19 April 1978 Tambling also played against Argentina at the Estadio Alberto J. Armando, in a warm up game as part of their preparations for hosting the 1978 FIFA World Cup. His teammates included Johnny Giles, Ray Treacy, Eamonn Gregg and Synan Braddish. The starting eleven for Argentina included nine players who later played in the 1978 FIFA World Cup Final. Argentina won this game 3–1. On these two occasions Tambling was a Waterford United player.

Career statistics

Chelsea

Honours
Chelsea
 Football League Cup: 1964–65
Cork Celtic
 League of Ireland: 1973–74

References
General

Specific

External links
Interview with Charlie Cooke, where he talks about "Chelsea's all-time leading scorer", 13 March 2012
Relationship between two Chelsea legends: Bobby Tambling and Frank Lampard | Barclays Premier League, La Liga,Serie A, Bundesliga, Ligue 1 : News, Previews, Match Highlights and Full Match with Barun Pandey, where he talks about "relationship between Tambling and Lampard", 29 April 2013

1941 births
Living people
English footballers
Association football forwards
England international footballers
England under-23 international footballers
English football managers
Chelsea F.C. players
Crystal Palace F.C. players
Waterford F.C. players
Shamrock Rovers F.C. players
Cork City F.C. managers
League of Ireland players
League of Ireland managers
English Jehovah's Witnesses
People from Storrington
English expatriates in Ireland
English Football League players
Cork Celtic F.C. players
Expatriate association footballers in the Republic of Ireland
League of Ireland XI players
English Football League representative players
Munster Senior League (association football) managers
FA Cup Final players